Hetch Hetchy Railroad no. 6 is a standard gauge three truck Shay locomotive built for the Hetch Hetchy Railroad by Lima Locomotive Works in 1921.

Although it operated as a common carrier, the Hetch Hetchy Railroad was built by the City of San Francisco to build the O'Shaughnessy Dam across Hetch Hetchy Valley as part of the city's water supply. The dam was completed in 1923 and the railroad scaled back operations, selling some of its equipment, including #6, which was sold to Pickering Lumber Corporation in Standard, California.  The locomotive served Pickering's logging operations until 1958 when it was retired.

The railroad operated four Shays at different times.  Number 6 was by far the largest, the only three truck Shay of the lot and weighing more than twice as much as the others.

It is in a small collection of railroad equipment owned by the National Park Service near El Portal, California. Number 6 was added to the National Register of Historic Places in 1978 as Hetch Hetchy Railroad Engine No.6.

References

External links 
 

Geared steam locomotives
History of Mariposa County, California
Individual locomotives of the United States
Lima locomotives
National Register of Historic Places in Mariposa County, California
Preserved steam locomotives of California
Railway locomotives introduced in 1921
Railway locomotives on the National Register of Historic Places
Rail transportation on the National Register of Historic Places in California
Standard gauge locomotives of the United States
Yosemite National Park